

Events 
Thomas Weelkes becomes organist at Winchester College.
The "first documented European music education" in the United States begins in a colony in New Mexico, founded by a group of Spanish friars accompanying Juan de Oñate.

Publications 
Gregor Aichinger –  (Innsbruck: Johannes Agricola), a collection of antiphons, hymns, Magnificats, and litanies for the Office of the Blessed Virgin, for three voices
Felice Anerio – Madrigals for three voices (Venice: Giacomo Vincenti)
Giovanni Artusi – First book of canzonettas for four voices (Venice: Giacomo Vincenti)
Giammateo Asola
 (Introits for the Sundays of the whole year) for four voices (Venice: Ricciardo Amadino)
 (Introits and Alleluias for all the solemnities of the year...) (Venice: Ricciardo Amadino)
 (Venice: Ricciardo Amadino), music for Compline, including an Alma Redemptoris Mater and an Ave Regina caelorum
Adriano Banchieri
Psalms for five voices (Venice: Ricciardo Amadino), includes pieces for Vespers for the entire year
, second book for three voices (Venice: Ricciardi Amadino), a madrigal comedy
Giovanni Bassano –  for five, six, seven, eight, and twelve voices (Venice: Giacomo Vincenti)
Giulio Belli –  for five voices (Venice: Ricciardo Amadino), Psalms for Vespers for the whole year, also includes two Magnificats and a Te Deum
Michael Cavendish – Ayres in Tabletorie
Scipione Dentice – Third book of madrigals for five voices (Naples: Giovanni Giacomo Carlino & Antonio Pace)
Johannes Eccard
  for five voices (Königsberg, Georg Osterberger), a wedding song
 for five voices (Königsberg, Georg Osterberger), a wedding song
 for four voices (Königsberg, Georg Osterberger), a wedding song
Giles Farnaby – [20] Canzonets to Fowre Voyces with a Song of Eight Parts (London: Peter Short), with a dedicatory poem in Latin by Anthony Holborne
Bartholomäus Gesius –  (Marian hymns) for five voices (Frankfurt an der Oder: Andreas Eichorn), also includes a New Year's motet for eight voices
Claude Le Jeune –  (La Rochelle: Hierosme Haultin), a collection of twelve psalms for two, three, four, five, six, and seven voices
Luzzasco Luzzaschi – First book of motets for five voices (Venice: Angelo Gardano)
Luca Marenzio – Eighth book of madrigals for five voices (Venice: Angelo Gardano)
Tiburtio Massaino – Third book of masses for five voices (Venice: Ricciardo Amadino)
Claudio Merulo – , Book 1 (Rome: Simone Verovio)
Philippe de Monte – Nineteenth book of madrigals for five voices (Venice: Angelo Gardano)
Peter Philips – Madrigals for eight voices (Antwerp: Pierre Phalèse)
Orfeo Vecchi
Second book of masses for five voices (Milan: heirs of Simon Tini & Giovanni Francesco Besozzi)
Second book of motets for five voices (Milan: heirs of Simon Tini & Giovanni Francesco Besozzi)
Third book of motets for six voices (Milan: heirs of Simon Tini & Giovanni Francesco Besozzi)
Thomas Weelkes – Balletts And Madrigals to five voyces
John Wilbye – The First Set Of English Madrigals To 3. 4. 5. and 6. voices

Opera 
Jacopo Peri (and Jacopo Corsi) – Dafne, the earliest known modern opera

Births 
April 9 – Johann Crüger, composer of hymns (died 1662)
date unknown
Charles d'Helfer, French baroque composer and maître de musique at Soissons Cathedral (died 1661)
Charles Racquet, organist and composer (died 1664)
Jan Vencálek, composer for lute and voice (date of death unknown)

Deaths 
April 8 – Ludwig Helmbold, poet of chorales (born 1532)
May 3 – Anna Guarini, virtuoso singer (born 1563) 
December – Giovanni Dragoni, composer and maestro di cappella (born c.1540)
date unknown 
Adrian Le Roy, French music publisher, lutenist, guitarist, composer and music educator (born c.1520)
Christoph Fischer or Vischer, hymnist (born c.1518/1520)
probable – Simon Bar Jona Madelka, composer
 Teodora Ginés, Dominican musician and composer (born c. 1530)

References

 
Music
16th century in music
Music by year